Burdett College, also known as Burdett Business College or Burdett College of Business and Shorthand, was an educational institution primarily located in Boston, Massachusetts. Founded in 1879, it focused on business and shorthand and operated as a junior college. It closed in 1999.

History

The college was founded on August 1, 1879, by brothers Charles A. Burdett (1858–1922) and Fred H. Burdett (1861–1935). They each served as president of the college, followed by Fred's wife, Sadie. Fred and Sadie's son, C. Fred Burdett (c.1905–1988), was then president from the mid-1930s until 1970.

In 1938, the institution was described a junior college of business training, offering one- and two-year courses of study in the areas of business administration, accounting, executive secretarial, stenographic, and general business.

Upon C. Fred Burdett's retirement in 1970, the college was sold to the Bradford School Corporation, a subsidiary of The Life Insurance Company of Virginia. The website for the Massachusetts Department of Higher Education lists the college as having closed in 1999. Bay State College in Boston is the custodian of records for several closed institutions, including Burdett College.

Locations

Locations of Burdett College included:
 167 Tremont Street, Boston (1882–1885)
 592 Washington Street, Boston (1886–1891)
 694 Washington Street, Boston (1891–1904)
 18 Boylston Street, Boston (1905–1928)
 156 Stuart Street, Boston (1928–1954)
 160 Beacon Street, Boston (1954–1972)
 745 Boylston Street, Boston (c. 1998)

 74 Mt. Vernon Street, Lynn, Massachusetts (c. 1939)
 100 Front Street, Worcester, Massachusetts (c. 1999)

Alumni

Notable alumni of the college include:
 Garrett H. Byrne, District Attorney of Suffolk County, Massachusetts
 John F. Cotter, Commissioner of the Boston Fire Department
 Joseph N. Hermann, Massachusetts politician
 William E. Hurley, Massachusetts politician
 Clementina Poto Langone, Italian-American activist, politician, and philanthropist
 John Shea (New Hampshire politician)
 Hal Weafer, major league baseball umpire
 Grafton Kenyon, Rhode Island businessman and politician

Athletics
The college fielded teams in several sports, including:
 Baseball – c.1894–c.1902
 Basketball – c.1948–c.1962
 In 1957, the team won the Boston Small College title, with a 10–0 record.
 Football – c.1895–c.1905
 Opponents included Phillips Exeter Academy, New Hampshire, and MIT.
 Ice polo – c.1896
 Note: a form of ice hockey played with a ball rather than a puck

References 

Defunct private universities and colleges in Massachusetts
Educational institutions established in 1879
Educational institutions disestablished in 1999
1879 establishments in Massachusetts